John Roth may refer to:

John Roth (clergyman) (1726–1791), Moravian clergyman
John Roth (businessman) (born 1942), Canadian CEO of Nortel
John K. Roth, American-based author, editor, and professor of philosophy of religion at Claremont McKenna College
John D. Roth, editor of the Mennonite Quarterly Review
John Roth (musician) (born 1967), guitarist with American band Winger
John Roth (geneticist) (born 1939), American geneticist at University of California, Davis
John Roth (politician), American politician from Michigan
John P. Roth, American government official

See also
Roth (surname)